Lew Rywin (born 10 November 1945 in a Nizhnyeye Alkeyevo, USSR) is a Polish film producer associated with Heritage Films (est. 1991). He has also been a member of the Polish Radio and TV committee and worked in an agency, Poltel, producing for Polish state-run TV.

He participated in producing such films as Steven Spielberg's Schindler's List, Roman Polański's The Pianist, Jan Jakub Kolski's Pornografia and Marek Brodzki's The Hexer, based on The Witcher books by Andrzej Sapkowski. His last film was never produced. It was about the life of Holocaust survivor Herman Rosenblat (with producers Harris Salomon and Abi Sirokh). The film was titled Love is a Survivor and was later changed to The Flower of the Fence. Altogether, he has served in a producer role in the making of 27 movies.

Filmography
 1997 : An Air So Pure (Executive Producer)

References

External links

See also
Rywin affair

Soviet Jews
Polish businesspeople
Polish film producers
1945 births
Living people
Polish politicians